Internacional or Clube Desportiva Internacional Dili is a football club of East Timor based in Dili.

References

Football clubs in East Timor
Football
Sport in Dili